The 1872 United States presidential election in New York took place on November 5, 1872. All contemporary 37 states were part of the 1872 United States presidential election. Voters chose 35 electors to the Electoral College, which selected the president and vice president.

New York was won by the Republican nominees, incumbent President Ulysses S. Grant of Illinois and his running mate Senator Henry Wilson of Massachusetts. Grant and Wilson defeated the Liberal Republican and Democratic nominees, former Congressman Horace Greeley of New York and his running mate former Senator and Governor Benjamin Gratz Brown of Missouri. 

Grant carried New York State with 53.23% of the vote to Greeley's 46.77%, a victory margin of 6.46%. 

New York weighed in for this election as slightly more than 5% more Democratic/Liberal Republican than the national average. 

Grant dominated much of upstate New York and also won some counties downstate in the New York City area, including Richmond County, Queens County, and Suffolk County. Greeley, however, did win New York City and Kings County. Greeley also won nearby Westchester County and Rockland County, along with a handful of rural upstate counties.

Results

See also
 United States presidential elections in New York
 Presidency of Ulysses S. Grant

References

New York
1872
1872 New York (state) elections